= Luz Maria Sanchez =

Mexican artist (born 1971)

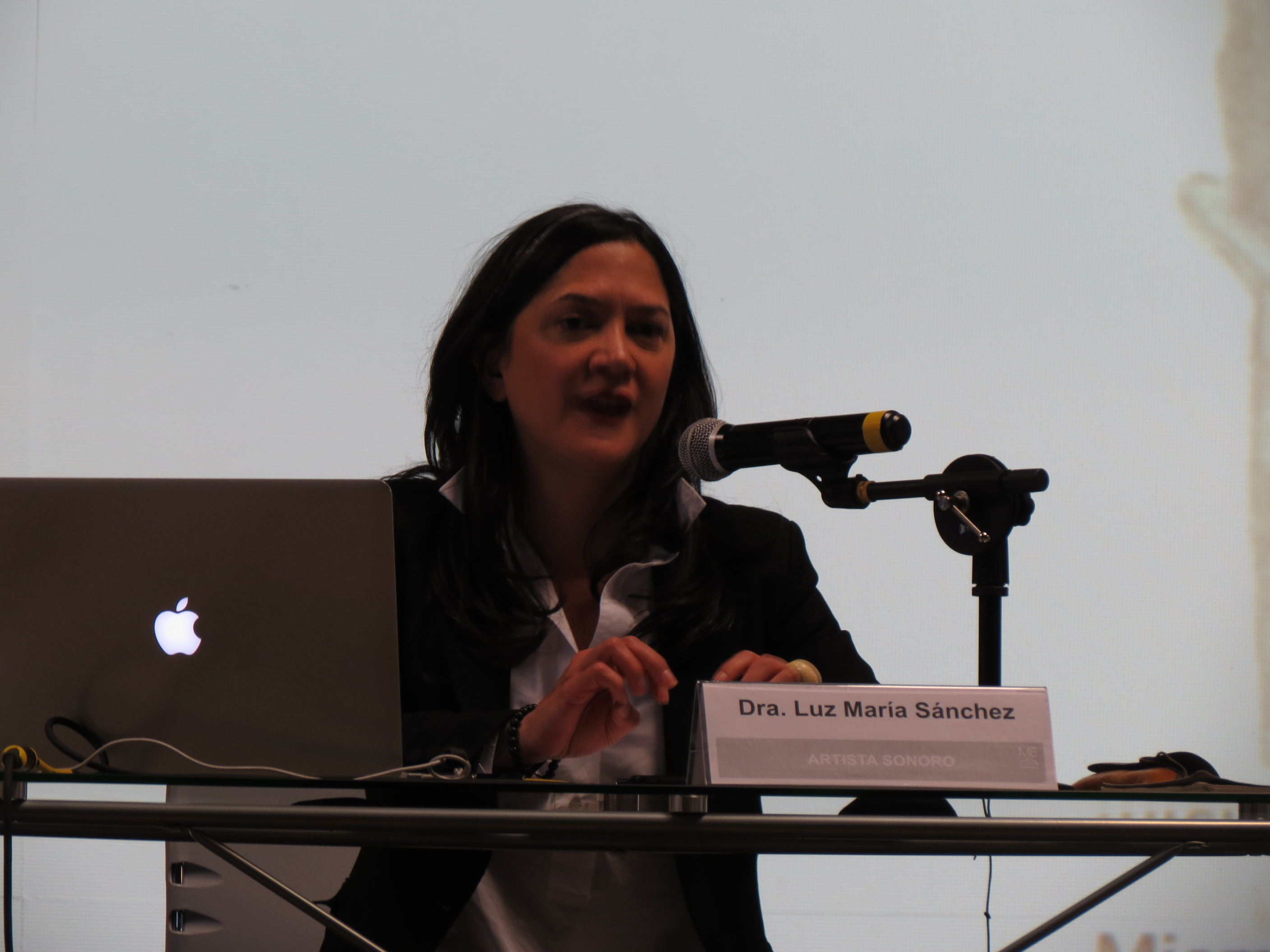

Luz Maria Sanchez (1971) is a sound and visual artist known for her projects and exhibitions commentating on violence within Mexico and its borders.

== Biography ==
Sanchez was born in 1971 Guadalajara, Mexico. Experiencing the loss of her father to gang violence in 1982, She earned a PhD from the Universitat de Barcelona in the subject of Art. Using her experiences with violence and her education, Sanchez has and continues to make art installations bringing awareness to the violence within Mexico and its borders. Sanchez has also been a professor at numerous universities and is an author.

== Notable work ==
Vis.[un]necessary force (2014-2021) is a four part series of exhibitions focusing on the gang violence within Mexico by using sounds recorded either during or after violent events. A website is available for people to listen to the audio clips.

Spanglish (2005-2006) is a group exhibit commentating on the combination of culture at the Mexican-American border in Texas.

Diaspora I/II (2006) is a sound installation of Sanchez reading off the names of 2487 known lives lost at the Mexican-American border.
